Stephensia is the scientific name for two genera of organisms and may refer to:

Stephensia (fungus), a genus of fungi in the family Pyronemataceae
Stephensia (moth ), a genus of moths in the family Elachistidae